Kisubi is a neighborhood in the Central Region of Uganda.

Location
The coordinates of Kisubi are:0°07'13.0"N, 32°31'58.0"E (Latitude:0.120272; Longitude:32.532790).

Points of interest
The following additional points of interest lie within the town limits or close to the edges of town:

 St. Mary's College Kisubi
 University of Kisubi, formerly the Kisubi Brothers University College, a constituent college of Uganda Martyrs University
 Kisubi Minor Seminary
 Kisubi Hospital, a private, non-profit, community hospital, owned by the Roman Catholic Archdiocese of Kampala
 St. Savio Junior School Kisubi, a residential, all-boys elementary school

See also
List of cities and towns in Uganda

References

External links

Wakiso District
Populated places in Central Region, Uganda